The 2013 IAAF World Cross Country Championships took place on March 24, 2013.  The races were held at the Myślęcinek Park in Bydgoszcz, Poland. 
Kenya topped the medal standings in the competition with 5 gold, and Ethiopia had the most overall medals with 10.
Reports of the event were given in the Herald and for the IAAF.

Schedule

Medallists

Results

Senior men's race (12 km)

Complete results for senior men and for senior men's teams were published.

102 participants from 30 countries participated.

Note: Athletes in parentheses did not score for the team result.
15 teams participated.

Senior women's race (8 km)

Complete results for senior women and for senior women's teams were published.

97 participants from 29 countries participated.

Note: Athletes in parentheses did not score for the team result.
15 teams participated.

Junior men's race (8 km)

Complete results for junior men and for junior men's teams were published.

113 participants from 27 countries participated.

Note: Athletes in parentheses did not score for the team result.
17 teams participated.

Junior women's race (6 km)

Complete results for junior women and for junior women's teams were published.

87 participants from 21 countries participated.

Note: Athletes in parentheses did not score for the team result.
15 teams participated.

Medal table 

Note: Totals include both individual and team medals, with medals in the team competition counting as one medal.

Participation
According to an unofficial count, 398 athletes from 41 countries participated.

 (18)
 (19)
 (6)
 (1)
 (2)
 (17)
 (3)
 (23)
 (8)
 (1)
 (14)
 (24)
 (12)
 (5)
 (7)
 (22)
 (24)
 (2)
 (4)
 (11)
 (2)
 (1)
 (4)
 (24)
 (6)
 (3)
 (1)
 (5)
 (16)
 (18)
 (4)
 (3)
 (4)
 (14)
 (18)
 (1)
 (23)
 (24)
 (1)
 (2)
 (1)

See also
 2013 IAAF World Cross Country Championships – Senior men's race
 2013 IAAF World Cross Country Championships – Junior men's race
 2013 IAAF World Cross Country Championships – Senior women's race
 2013 IAAF World Cross Country Championships – Junior women's race
 2013 in athletics (track and field)

References

External links

Official website at the IAAF

 
World Athletics Cross Country Championships
World Cross Country Championships
World Cross Country Championships
International athletics competitions hosted by Poland
Cross country running in Poland
Sport in Bydgoszcz
March 2013 sports events in Europe
History of Bydgoszcz